Chañaral Province is one of three provinces in the northern Chilean region of Atacama (III). Its capital is the small coastal town of Chañaral.

Geography and demography
Between the 1992 and 2002 censuses, the population fell by 22.5% (9,319 persons).

Administration
As a province, Chañaral is a second-level administrative division of Chile, which is further divided into two communes (comunas): Chañaral and Diego de Almagro. The province is administered by a presidentially appointed provincial delegate. Jorge Fernández Herrera was appointed by president Gabriel Boric.

References

Provinces of Atacama Region
Provinces of Chile